John McGuire is the name of:

Entertainment
John McGuire (actor) (1910–1980), American actor
John McGuire (businessman), Irish businessman and television presenter
John McGuire (composer) (born 1942), American composer
John J. McGuire (1917–1981), American author of science fiction
John Allen McGuire (born 1985), guitarist for rock band July for Kings

Politics
John A. McGuire (1906–1976), U.S. Representative from Connecticut
John McGuire (Virginia politician) (born 1968), Virginia House of Delegates
Jack McGuire (1933–2020), Illinois politician

Sports
Johnny McGuire (1893–1962), Scottish-American soccer player
John McGuire (footballer) (1902–?), English footballer
John McGuire (sportsman) (born 1954), Australian rules football player and cricketer

See also
John Maguire (disambiguation)